The 2017 season is Tromsø's third season back in the Tippeligaen following their relegation in 2013, their 30th season in the top flight of Norwegian football and their second season with Bård Flovik as their manager.

Squad

Out on loan

Transfers

Winter

In:

Out:

Summer

In:

Out:

Competitions

Tippeligaen

Results summary

Results by round

Results

Table

Norwegian Cup

Squad statistics

Appearances and goals

|-
|colspan="14"|Players away from Tromsø on loan:

|-
|colspan="14"|Players who left Tromsø during the season:

|}

Goal scorers

Disciplinary record

References

Tromsø IL seasons
Tromsø